"Remix" is a song by Puerto Rican rapper Daddy Yankee from his seventh and final studio album, Legendaddy, both released on March 24, 2022 alongside a music video directed by Venezuelan director Daniel Durán. It was written by Daddy Yankee, Puerto Rican producers Roberto "Nekxum" Figueroa, Ovimael "OMB" Maldonado and Ángel "JBD" Barbosa and Puerto Rican rapper Pusho, and was produced by Daddy Yankee, Nekxum, OMB and JBD.

It is a reggaeton song about exalting the attributes of women with breast and butt implants, an allegory to remix versions being better than the originals. Commercially, "Remix" reached number 147 on the Billboard Global 200, as well as number one in Monitor Latino's Puerto Rico and Mexico and the US Latin Airplay chart, as well as number five in Honduras. It also peaked within the top 40 in Chile and Spain and received a Latin platinum certification in the United States.

Background and composition
"Remix" was written by Daddy Yankee, Roberto "Nekxum" Figueroa, Ovimael "OMB" Maldonado, Ángel "JBD" Barbosa and rapper Pusho, and was produced and programmed by Daddy Yankee, Nekxum, OMB and JBD. It was recorded and mixed by OMB and mastered by American audio engineer Michael Fuller. It is a reggaeton song with a duration of two minutes and forty-three seconds and its lyrics are about exalting the attributes of women with breast and butt implants—an allegory to remix versions being better than the originals—and includes a sample of the chorus from Daddy Yankee's single "Impacto" (2007).

Commercial performance
Following the release of Daddy Yankee's Legendaddy, "Remix" debuted at number 147 on the Billboard Global 200 and charted for one week, becoming the record's third highest-peaking song on the list after "X Última Vez" and "Rumbatón". It was the album's second highest-charting track in the United States, reaching number 13 and 17 on Billboards Hot Latin Songs and Bubbling Under Hot 100 charts, respectively, as well as number one on Latin Airplay. It received a Latin platinum certification by the Recording Industry Association of America (RIAA) on May 26, 2022 for units of over 60,000 track-equivalent streams. In Spanish-speaking countries, it peaked at number one in Puerto Rico and Monitor Latino's Mexico for three and two weeks, respectively, and reached number five in Honduras. It also peaked at number 13 and 38 in Chile and Spain, respectively, and at number 25 on the Paraguayan monthly top 100.

Live performances
"Remix" was included in the setlist of Daddy Yankee's farewell concert tour, La Última Vuelta.

Credits and personnel
JBD – producer, programming, songwriting
Michael Fuller – mastering engineer
Nekxum – producer, programming, songwriting
OMB – producer, programming, recording engineer, mixing engineer, songwriting
Pusho – songwriting
Daddy Yankee – vocals, producer, programming, songwriting

Charts

Weekly charts

Monthly charts

Year-end charts

Certifications

See also
List of Billboard Hot Latin Songs and Latin Airplay number ones of 2022

References

Daddy Yankee songs
2022 songs
Songs written by Daddy Yankee